The 2012 Asian Youth Boys Volleyball Championship was held in Azadi Volleyball Hall, Azadi Sport Complex, Tehran, Iran.

Pools composition
The teams are seeded based on their final ranking at the 2010 Asian Youth Boys Volleyball Championship.

* Withdrew

Preliminary round

Pool A

|}

|}

Pool B

|}

|}

Pool C

|}

|}

Pool D

|}

|}

Classification round
 The results and the points of the matches between the same teams that were already played during the preliminary round shall be taken into account for the classification round.

Pool E

|}

|}

Pool F

|}

|}

Pool G

|}

Pool H

|}

|}

Classification 9th–11th

Semifinals

|}

9th place

|}

Final round

Quarterfinals

|}

5th–8th semifinals

|}

Semifinals

|}

7th place

|}

5th place

|}

3rd place

|}

Final

|}

Final standing

Awards
MVP:  Akbar Valaei
Best Scorer:  Yuki Ishikawa
Best Spiker:  Zhang Zhejia
Best Blocker:  Sahand Allahverdian
Best Server:  Javad Hekmati
Best Setter:  Yu Yaochen
Best Libero:  Lee Sang-uk

References

External links
Asian Volleyball Confederation
FIVB

Asian Boys' U18 Volleyball Championship
Asian Cup
Volleyball
Volleyball